The 1961 Craven A Gold Star was a motor race staged at the Mount Panorama Circuit near Bathurst in New South Wales, Australia on 3 April 1961. The race was contested over 19 laps at a total distance of approximately 75 miles and it was Round 2 of the 1961 Australian Drivers' Championship.

The race was won by Bill Patterson driving a Cooper T51 Climax.

Results

References

Craven A Gold Star
Motorsport in Bathurst, New South Wales